"On My Way" is a song by British singer-songwriter Charlie Brown. The song was released in the United Kingdom on 24 March 2013 as a single digital download. The song peaked at number seven on the UK Singles Chart.

Music video
A music video to accompany the release of "On My Way" was first released onto YouTube on 18 January 2013 at a total length of three minutes and sixteen seconds. The video features Brown depicting his childhood as he grows up listening to a music player appearing to write lyrics in a school book in which at the end of the video he is seen with his friends who listen to the track and seem to approve then receiving a CD with Brown's label on the front and Brown appearing to go on stage at the end.

Versions of the song
The following versions of the song are available for sale as digital downloads:

Chart performance
The song entered at number seven on the UK Singles Chart on 31 March 2013 ― for the week ending dated 6 April 2013.

Weekly charts

Year-end charts

Release history

References

2013 singles
All Around the World Productions singles
2013 songs